John Stuart Thomson (1869–1950) was an author from the United States.  He wrote the books China Revolutionized, The Chinese, Bud and Bamboo, and Fil and Filippa: Story of Child Life in the Philippines.

Works
Estabelle and Other Verses (1897)
Henry Wadsworth Longfellow (1897)
Eulaline (1899)
A Day's Song (1900)

The Opium Crusade in China (1909)
 
Fil and Filippa: Story of Child Life in the Philippines (1917)
Business men! Be publicists! (1919)
Retention of Philippines (1920)
Bud and Bamboo (c. 1923)
Alliance with Japan

See also
Thomasites

References

External links
 
 
THE NEW CHINA; Tendency Toward Republicanism Shown in Its History, with China Revolutionized by John Stuart Thomson, The Bobbs-Merrill Company (Abstract), The New York Times, 25 January 1914

19th-century American novelists
20th-century American novelists
American male novelists
1869 births
1950 deaths
American historical novelists
19th-century American poets
20th-century American poets
American male poets
American male essayists
19th-century American male writers
19th-century essayists
20th-century American essayists
20th-century American male writers